Highland (and neighboring "East Highlands") is a city in San Bernardino County, California, United States. The population of the city was 53,104 as of the 2010 census, up from 44,605 at the 2000 census. The term Highland also refers to a geographical area of the city of San Bernardino (generally east of Del Rosa Avenue to the eastern city limits), and parts of unincorporated San Bernardino County. Highland is generally divided into two regions, East Highlands and Highland (Generally considered west of State Route 210, with the majority of inhabitants living east of the freeway.)

Geography
Highland is located at  (34.118459, -117.202370).

According to the United States Census Bureau, the city has a total area of 18.9 square miles (48.9 km).  18.8 square miles (48.6 km) of it is land and 0.1 square miles (0.3 km) of it (0.71%) is water.

Demographics

2010
At the 2010 census Highland had a population of 53,104. The racial makeup of Highland was 27,836 (52.4%) White (30.8% Non-Hispanic White), 5,887 (11.1%) African American, 542 (1.0%) Native American, 3,954 (7.4%) Asian, 168 (0.3%) Pacific Islander, 11,826 (22.3%) from other races, and 2,891 (5.4%) from two or more races. Hispanic or Latino of any race were 25,556 persons (48.1%).

The census reported that 52,932 people (99.7% of the population) lived in households, 76 (0.1%) lived in non-institutionalized group quarters, and 96 (0.2%) were institutionalized.

There were 15,471 households, 7,922 (51.2%) had children under the age of 18 living in them, 8,475 (54.8%) were opposite-sex married couples living together, 2,884 (18.6%) had a female householder with no husband present, 1,183 (7.6%) had a male householder with no wife present. There were 1,129 (7.3%) unmarried opposite-sex partnerships, and 109 (0.7%) same-sex married couples or partnerships. 2,254 households (14.6%) were one person and 757 (4.9%) had someone living alone who was 65 or older. The average household size was 3.42. There were 12,542 families (81.1% of households); the average family size was 3.74.

The age distribution was 16,916 people (31.9%) under the age of 18, 5,900 people (11.1%) aged 18 to 24, 13,837 people (26.1%) aged 25 to 44, 12,357 people (23.3%) aged 45 to 64, and 4,094 people (7.7%) who were 65 or older. The median age was 30.6 years. For every 100 females, there were 95.1 males. For every 100 females age 18 and over, there were 91.3 males.

There were 16,578 housing units at an average density of 877.6 per square mile, of the occupied units 10,106 (65.3%) were owner-occupied and 5,365 (34.7%) were rented. The homeowner vacancy rate was 2.2%; the rental vacancy rate was 8.7%. 33,361 people (62.8% of the population) lived in owner-occupied housing units and 19,571 people (36.9%) lived in rental housing units.

2000
At the 2000 census, there were 44,605 people in 13,478 households, including 10,782 families, in the city. The population density was 3,273.3 inhabitants per square mile (1,263.5/km). The racial makeup of the city was 56.3% White, 12.1% African American, 1.3% Native American, 6.1% Asian, 0.3% Pacific Islander, 18.6% from other races, and 5.2% from two or more races. Hispanic or Latino of any race were 36.6% of the population.

Of the 13,478 households 47.9% had children under the age of 18 living with them, 55.1% were married couples living together, 19.0% had a female householder with no husband present, and 20.0% were non-families. 15.4% of households were one person and 4.8% were one person aged 65 or older. The average household size was 3.3 and the average family size was 3.6.

The age distribution was 35.6% under the age of 18, 9.0% from 18 to 24, 30.0% from 25 to 44, 19.0% from 45 to 64, and 6.5% 65 or older. The median age was 29 years. For every 100 females, there were 95.4 males. For every 100 females age 18 and over, there were 91.9 males.

The median household income was $41,230 and the median family income  was $43,649. Males had a median income of $38,695 versus $27,308 for females. The per capita income for the city was $16,039. About 17.5% of families and 21.5% of the population were below the poverty line, including 29.2% of those under age 18 and 10.9% of those age 65 or over.

The city is split along Boulder Avenue with the higher-income area to the east and lower-income area to the west. Demographics such as income levels and housing density are also split evenly by the geographic divider of Boulder Avenue. Much of western Highland is significantly older and mirrors San Bernardino, while significant development of eastern Highland did not officially begin until the early 1990s and are consistent of higher-end, upper-middle class suburban developments reminiscent Rancho Cucamonga and Eastvale, California while toting single family homes that boast architecture mirroring that of Orange County, CA. 

This surge in housing duly creates an unofficial financial and geographical divide between residents with East Highlands' newly formed residential neighborhoods stretching out some 5-6 miles to formulate the suburban neighborhoods collectively defining "East Highlands Ranch"; traveling parallel its southern "sister sister" of Redlands, CA curtailing within the undeveloped orange groves resting just outside of Mentone and Yucaipa, California.

Climate

Education

Highland is served by two public school districts: Redlands Unified and San Bernardino Unified School Districts (the boundaries are generally defined by City Creek; residents east of City Creek are in the Redlands Unified School District while those west of City Creek are served by San Bernardino City Unified School District).

Highland is home to a library and environmental learning center. The Highland Sam J. Racadio Library and Environmental Learning Center is a gold-rated LEED building. It holds thousands of books, CDs, DVDs, and other items. It offers free computer access and Wi-fi. It has a rooftop garden and is home to animals, amphibians, and reptiles from around the globe.

Local colleges and universities include: Loma Linda University, University of Redlands, California State University's San Bernardino campus, and the two-campus San Bernardino Community College District (which includes Crafton Hills College in Yucaipa and San Bernardino Valley College).

Government

Local
Highland was founded as a townsite in 1891 and incorporated as a California general law city in  November 1987.  It follows a City Manager, City Council form of government with the City Manager appointed by the City Council.

State and federal

Public safety
The San Bernardino County Sheriff's Department provides contracted police services to the city of Highland from their regional station located at 26985 Base Line Road. The new  police station was recently built and occupied in June, 2011.

The city has contracted with Cal Fire to operate its fire services (three stations) since its incorporation.

Sister cities
  Berdzor, Artsakh Republic
 Redlands CA and Colton CA

References

External links

The Highland Community News (newspaper)
Highland Area Chamber of Commerce

 
1987 establishments in California
Cities in San Bernardino County, California
Incorporated cities and towns in California
Populated places established in 1987
Populated places on the Santa Ana River